The  Dallas Cowboys season was the franchise's 52nd season in the National Football League (NFL), the third playing their home games at Cowboys Stadium and the first full season under head coach Jason Garrett. The team improved on their 6–10 record from 2010, but missed the playoffs for the second consecutive season due to their week 17 loss to the eventual Super Bowl champion New York Giants.

2011 draft class

Notes
 The Cowboys forfeited its original seventh-round selection after selecting defensive tackle Josh Brent in the 2010 Supplemental Draft. 
The Cowboys later acquired a new seventh-round selection in a trade that sent wide receiver Patrick Crayton to the San Diego Chargers.

Schedule

Preseason

The Cowboys' preseason schedule was announced on April 12, 2011.

Schedule

Game summaries

Week 1: at New York Jets

Week 2: at San Francisco 49ers

Week 3: vs. Washington Redskins

Week 4: vs. Detroit Lions

With their second loss to the Lions at home in five years, the Cowboys fell to 2–2.

Week 6: at New England Patriots

The Cowboys' blue uniforms returned after a 1-year hiatus, and they blew a 3-point fourth quarter lead, and lost to the 2011 AFC champion New England Patriots.

Week 7: vs. St. Louis Rams

This game is notable for DeMarco Murray, in his first NFL start, setting the Cowboys single game rushing record.

Week 8: at Philadelphia Eagles

Week 9: vs. Seattle Seahawks

Week 10: vs. Buffalo Bills

Week 11: at Washington Redskins

Week 12: vs. Miami Dolphins
Thanksgiving Day game

Coming off their thrilling overtime road win over the Redskins, the Cowboys went home, donned their throwback uniforms, and played a Week 12 interconference duel with the Miami Dolphins in the annual Thanksgiving game.  Dallas trailed early in the first quarter with Dolphins kicker Shayne Graham getting a 26-yard field goal, yet the Cowboys would answer in the second quarter with a 26-yard field goal from kicker Dan Bailey, followed by quarterback Tony Romo finding wide receiver Laurent Robinson on a 5-yard touchdown pass.  Miami would close out the half with Graham making a 28-yard field goal.

The Dolphins retook the lead in the third quarter with Graham booting a 27-yard field goal, followed by quarterback Matt Moore completing a 35-yard touchdown pass to wide receiver Brandon Marshall.  Afterwards, Dallas regained the lead in the fourth quarter with Romo connecting with Robinson again on an 18-yard touchdown pass.  Miami struck back with Graham making a 23-yard field goal, but Bailey rescued the Cowboys by nailing the winning 28-yard field goal.

With the win, Dallas improved to 7–4.

Bailey (2/2 on field goal, including game-winning 28-yarder) and linebacker DeMarcus Ware (1 assist and a fumble recovery) were named CBS' All-Iron Award winners.

Week 13: at Arizona Cardinals

With seconds left in regulation with the score at 13-13, Jason Garrett called a time out before Dan Bailey was set to kick a 49-yard field goal that would have ended the game (commonly referred to as "icing the kicker"); Bailey ended up missing the field goal and the Cowboys lost the game in overtime.

Week 14: vs. New York Giants

Week 15: at Tampa Bay Buccaneers

Week 16: vs. Philadelphia Eagles

Week 17: at New York Giants

With the loss, the Cowboys finished at 8–8 and missed the playoffs for a second consecutive year.

Standings

Staff

Rosters

Opening preseason roster

Week one roster

Final roster

References

External links
 
 Pro Football Hall of Fame
 Dallas Cowboys Official Site

Dallas
Dallas Cowboys seasons
Dallas
2010s in Dallas